St Peter's Episcopal Church is a brick Gothic Revival style church built in 1912 in Sheridan, Wyoming. It was listed on the National Register of Historic Places in 2013.

It was designed by architect Edward E. Hendrickson of Frank Miles Day firm in Philadelphia. It has brick walls upon a concrete and sandstone foundation.

References

External links
St. Peter's, official site
Episcopal churches in Wyoming
National Register of Historic Places in Sheridan County, Wyoming
Sheridan, Wyoming